The 1884 New York Metropolitans finished with a 75–32 record, first place in the American Association. After the season, they played the National League champion Providence Grays in the 1884 World Series and lost three games to zero.

Regular season

Season standings

Record vs. opponents

Opening Day lineup

Roster

Player stats

Batting

Starters by position 
Note: Pos = Position; G = Games played; AB = At bats; H = Hits; Avg. = Batting average; HR = Home runs

Other batters 
Note: G = Games played; AB = At bats; H = Hits; Avg. = Batting average; HR = Home runs

Pitching

Starting pitchers 
Note: G = Games pitched; IP = Innings pitched; W = Wins; L = Losses; ERA = Earned run average; SO = Strikeouts

The World Series of 1884 

Providence Grays (NL) (84–28) vs New York Metropolitans (AA) (75–32)

Game 1 
Friday, October 23, at the Polo Grounds

Providence defeats New York 6–0

Game 2 
Saturday, October 24, at the Polo Grounds

Providence defeats New York 3–1 (7 innings)

Game 3 
Sunday, October 25, at the Polo Grounds

Providence defeats New York 12–2 (6 innings)

References 
 1884 New York Metropolitans team page at Baseball Reference

New York Metropolitans seasons
New York Metropolitans season
New York Metropolitans season
19th century in Manhattan
Washington Heights, Manhattan